Fábio Alves da Silva (born 9 March 1988), commonly known as Fábio Alves, is a Brazilian professional footballer who plays as an left-back for Floresta.

Club career
On 17 April 2022, Fábio Alves scored a long-range free kick for Floresta against Vitória, garnering international recognition.

Career statistics

Club

Notes

References

1988 births
Living people
Footballers from Curitiba
Brazilian footballers
Association football defenders
Campeonato Brasileiro Série C players
Campeonato Brasileiro Série D players
Cianorte Futebol Clube players
Mirassol Futebol Clube players
Duque de Caxias Futebol Clube players
Club Sportivo Sergipe players
Associação Chapecoense de Futebol players
Londrina Esporte Clube players
Clube Atlético Penapolense players
Rio Branco Sport Club players
Esporte Clube São José players
Paysandu Sport Club players
Agremiação Sportiva Arapiraquense players
União Recreativa dos Trabalhadores players
Botafogo Futebol Clube (PB) players
Uberlândia Esporte Clube players
Floresta Esporte Clube players